Meatballs 4 (also known as Meatballs 4: To the Rescue) is a 1992 comedy film and the fourth and final installment in the Meatballs series of films. It was shot in its entirety at Bass Lake, California, in the late summer of 1991. Originally conceived as a comedy-drama titled Happy Campers, the project was retooled after production had begun to be part of the Meatballs series.

Plot
Ricky Wade is the hottest waterskiing instructor around, and he has just been rehired by his former employer/camp to whip up attendance. However, the camp is in serious financial trouble and the owner of a rival, more popular, camp wants to buy them out. Thus, the two camps engage in a winner-take-all competition that will settle the rivalry once and for all.

Cast
 Corey Feldman as Ricky Wade
 Sarah Douglas as Monica Shavetts
 Jack Nance as Neil Peterson
 Steven M. Bradley as Nelson Beyers, Ski Judge
 Bojesse Christopher as Wes Ford 
 Brad Grunberg as Victor "Johnny Cocktails" Thigpen
 J. Trevor Edmond as Howie Duncan 
 Paige French as Jennifer Lipton 
 John Mendoza as Dick 
 Bentley Mitchum as Kyle Linck 
 Deborah Tucker as Kelly Peterson 
 Frank Walton as Nunzio 
 Cristy Thom as Hillary
 Brian Christensen as Michael Peltz 
 Jojo Farkas as Bus Driver 
 Monique de Lacy as Lovelie #1
 Neriah Davis as Nariah

References

External links
 MeatballsOnline Meatballs Movie Website

1992 films
1992 comedy films
1990s English-language films
Films about summer camps
Films shot in California
American comedy films
Films directed by Bob Logan
1990s American films